Triumph Motorcycles may refer to:

 Triumph Engineering  Co Ltd, a defunct British motorcycle manufacturer 
 Norton Villiers Triumph, a defunct British motorcycle manufacturer 
 Triumph Motorcycles Ltd, a current British motorcycle manufacturer
 Triumph (TWN), a defunct German motorcycle manufacturer